Gabriella Tóth (born 16 December 1986) is a Hungarian former footballer who played as a midfielder, most notably for Werder Bremen in the Bundesliga and the Hungary national team. She retired at the end of the 2021–22 season.

Honours
Viktória FC-Szombathely
 Hungarian League: 2009
 Hungarian Cups: 2008, 2009

References

External links
 

1986 births
Living people
Sportspeople from Debrecen
Hungarian women's footballers
Women's association football midfielders
Hungary women's international footballers
Viktória FC-Szombathely players
SV Werder Bremen (women) players
Frauen-Bundesliga players
Hungarian expatriate sportspeople in Germany
Expatriate women's footballers in Germany